Thommo Reachea III or Sri Dharmaraja III, Chey Chettha VI (1690–1747), born Ang Tham, was a Cambodian king in Cambodia's history (r. 1702–1705, 1707–1714, 1736–1747).

Ang Tham was a son of Chey Chettha IV. He ascended the throne in 1702. He came into conflict with the vice king (uparaja) Ang Em (Barom Ramadhipati), later, he drove out Ang Em with the help of Ayutthaya Kingdom. Ang Em fled to Saigon in 1705, and sought help from Vietnamese Nguyễn lord. Vietnamese army invaded Cambodia, Thommo Reachea III fled to Ayutthaya Kingdom.

With the help of Ayutthaya Kingdom, he captured Longvek. The army of Ang Em was surrounded. A Vietnamese army under Trần Thượng Xuyên and Nguyễn Cửu Phú (阮久富) was sent to Cambodia to help Ang Em. Thommo Reachea III and Chey Chettha IV were defeated and fled to Ayutthaya Kingdom.

In 1736, Thommo Reachea III came back to Cambodia, and drove out the king Satha II.

Notes

Citations

References

Achille Dauphin-Meunier, Histoire du Cambodge, Que sais-je ? N° 916, P.U.F 1968.
Anthony Stokvis, Manuel d'histoire, de généalogie et de chronologie de tous les États du globe, depuis les temps les plus reculés jusqu'à nos jours, préf. H. F. Wijnman, éditions Brill Leyde 1888, réédition 1966, Volume I part1: Asie, chapitre XIV §.9 « Kambodge » Listes et  tableau généalogique n°34  p. 337-338. 
Peter Truhart, Regents of Nations, K.G Saur Münich, 1984-1988 , Art. « Kampuchea », p. 1732.
Phoeun Mak. « L'introduction de la Chronique royale du Cambodge du lettré Nong ». Dans : Bulletin de l'École française d'Extrême-Orient. Tome 67, 1980. p. 135-145.

1690 births
1747 deaths
18th-century Cambodian monarchs